Cerupa is an album by the American jazz saxophonist/flautist Cecil Payne, recorded in 1993 and released by the Delmark label in 1995.

Reception

AllMusic reviewer Michael G. Nastos stated: "At age 72, Cecil Payne makes a recorded comeback with this release. He sounds in fine form, playing with dexterity, clarity, and depth on baritone sax, and brings out his flute for two of the eight cuts. ... As great a baritone saxophonist as Payne has always been, his recording career is checkered. On the big horn, and especially flute where he is an unsung hero, this CD proves a great statement for an enduring jazzman who was never far from the truth, and still digs what he's doing. Recommended as perhaps his best documented work".

Track listing
All compositions by Cecil Payne, except where noted.
 "The Opening" – 7:36
 "Bolambo" – 8:43
 "I Should Care" (Axel Stordahl, Paul Weston, Sammy Cahn) – 8:42
 "Cerupa" – 8:05
 "Be Wee" – 9:23
 "Cuba" (Gil Fuller) – 4:46
 "Bosco" – 8:54
 "Brookfield Andante" – 13:19

Personnel
Cecil Payne - baritone saxophone, flute
Freddie Hubbard (track 5), Dr. Odies Williams III (track 8) – trumpet 
Eric Alexander – tenor saxophone
Harold Mabern – piano 
John Ore – bass
Joe Farnsworth – drums

References

1995 albums
Delmark Records albums
Cecil Payne albums
Albums produced by Bob Koester